Kirkland is a historic railway station located in West Whiteland Township, Chester County, Pennsylvania. It was built between 1860 and 1879, and is a two-story, brick building.  A small two-story, one room addition was built in the early-19th century.  It was moved to its present location in 1880, when the Pennsylvania Railroad straightened the track at Kirkland.  The building served as a ticket office and residence for the agent.

It was listed on the National Register of Historic Places in 1983 as Kirkland Station.

References

Railway stations on the National Register of Historic Places in Pennsylvania
Railway stations in the United States opened in 1860
Railway stations in Chester County, Pennsylvania
Buildings and structures completed in 1879
Former Pennsylvania Railroad stations
National Register of Historic Places in Chester County, Pennsylvania